The 47th Battalion (British Columbia), CEF, was an infantry battalion of the Canadian Expeditionary Force during the Great War.

History 
The 47th Battalion was authorized on 7 November 1914 and embarked for Britain on 13 November 1915. It disembarked in France on 11 August 1916, where it fought as part of the 10th Infantry Brigade, 4th Canadian Division in France and Flanders until the end of the war. By war's end the 47th had lost 899 men. One third of the fatalities, 271 men, were killed in the last 100 days of the war. The battalion was disbanded on 30 August 1920. The 47th Battalion recruited in New Westminster, Vancouver and Victoria, British Columbia and was mobilized at New Westminster.

The 47th Battalion had four officers commanding:
Lt-Col W.N. Winsby, 13 November 1915 – 24 April 1917
Lt.Col. M.J. Francis, 24 April 1917 – 14 December 1917
Lt.Col. R.H. Webb, MC, 14 December 1917 – 24 April 1918
Lt.Col. H.L. Keegan, DSO, 24 April 1918-demobilization
One member of the 47th Battalion was awarded the Victoria Cross. Acting Corporal (later Sergeant) Filip Konowal was awarded the Victoria Cross for his actions during the period 22–24 August 1917, at the Battle of Hill 70 in Lens, France.

Later in the war the 47th was designated the 47th Western Ontario Battalion because there were more men from that area in the unit than any other part of the country.

Battle Honours 
The 47th Battalion was awarded the following battle honours:
Mount Sorrel
Somme, 1916
Ancre Heights
Ancre, 1916
Arras, 1917, '18
Vimy, 1917
Hill 70
Ypres 1917
Passchendaele
Amiens
Scarpe 1918
Drocourt-Quéant
Hindenburg Line
Canal du Nord
Valenciennes
France and Flanders, 1916-18

Perpetuation 
The 47th Battalion (British Columbia), CEF, is perpetuated by The Royal Westminster Regiment.

See also 

 List of infantry battalions in the Canadian Expeditionary Force

References

Sources
Canadian Expeditionary Force 1914-1919 by Col. G.W.L. Nicholson, CD, Queen's Printer, Ottawa, Ontario, 1962

047
1914 establishments in British Columbia
Military units and formations of British Columbia
Royal Westminster Regiment